William Hanna "Buster" Collins (15 February 1920 – 3 November 2010) was an Irish professional footballer. His clubs included Distillery, Belfast Celtic, Luton Town and Gillingham.

He later became reserve team manager at Gillingham, and in 1965 was appointed by manager Freddie Cox as the head of the club's newly organised youth scheme, a post he held for nearly twenty years. He served as first team trainer and kitman for a further ten years, finally retiring in 1993 at the age of 73.  He has been cited as a major influence on the careers of future stars Micky Adams and Steve Bruce.

He died in 2010 at the age of 90.

References

1920 births
2010 deaths
Belfast Celtic F.C. players
Lisburn Distillery F.C. players
Association football wingers
Gillingham F.C. players
Gillingham F.C. managers
NIFL Premiership players
Luton Town F.C. players
Association footballers from Northern Ireland
Expatriate footballers in England
Association footballers from Belfast
English Football League players
Gillingham F.C. non-playing staff
Football managers from Northern Ireland